"Las Vegas culture" is the name given to many Archaic settlements which flourished between 8000 BCE and 4600 BCE.(10,000 to 6,600 BP) near the coast of present-day Ecuador. The name comes from the location of the most prominent settlement, Site No. 80, near the Las Vegas River and now within the city of Santa Elena. The Las Vegas culture represents "an early, sedentary adjustment to an ecologically complex coastal environment."

The Las Vegas culture is important because it was one of the earliest cultures in South America to practice agriculture.

Setting
The Las Vegas culture existed on the coast of Ecuador along the Santa Elena Peninsula from about 8000 BCE to 4600 BCE. It is one of the earliest settlements found in Ecuador and is notable for its role in domesticating wild squash and maize. It is also home to one of the largest burial sites in South America, where remains of at least 192 individuals were found. The Santa Elena peninsula is the northernmost extension of the coastal desert that stretches for some  along the Pacific coast of South America. Under the influence of the cool waters of the Humboldt Current, temperatures are mild, averaging  with only a few degrees in seasonal variation. The natural vegetation near the coast is xeric featuring cacti and other desert plants. Inland, precipitation generally increases and the vegetation becomes more varied and lush, changing from desert to seasonally dry forest..

Ten thousand years ago sea level on the Santa Elena peninsula was  lower than at present. Thus, the known settlements of the Las Vegas period were further inland then than they are now and some ancient settlements may have been covered by the rising sea.   The dry climate and xeric vegetation seem to have persisted throughout the 10,000 year period. The sea levels began rising around 7000 years ago, shrinking the area of land the settlement was found on. All life in the area would have been subject to changing sea levels and tectonic shifts over several thousand years. A changing environment affected the subsistence patterns of the Las Vegas people, as noted by a change in diet between the early and late Las Vegas periods.  Faunal remains suggest a dry, forested environment that did not receive enough rain throughout the year to turn into a wetland forest. Plant remains support this environment; grass and shrub remains indicative of a dryer climate were found in abundance. The mostly dry season that lasted throughout the majority of the year is typical of regions where maize is grown well. A rise in sea levels along with an annual dry season could have motivated the Las Vegas people to pursue plant domestication and gathering of marine resources for food.

Additional similar sites of human habitation probably remain to be discovered near and along several hundred miles of Ecuadorian coast  Prior to the rise in sea levels, the coasts supported mangrove swamps. Mangrove clams were a notable part of the Las Vegas diet. As sea levels rose, the mangroves seem to have been wiped out. After about 6000 BCE, the mangrove clams shrink from Las Vegas assemblages.

Description
Evidence of a human presence of the Santa Elena peninsula has been radiocarbon dated back to 8800 BCE, but with the onset of the Las Vegas period about 8000 BC, the evidence becomes much more extensive. Archaeologists have divided the Las Vegas culture into two periods: early Las Vegas from 8000 to 6000 BCE, and late Las Vegas from 6000 BCE to 4600 BCE.  The dividing line between the two periods is a lacuna in the archaeological record at one representative site. The Las Vegas culture was pre-ceramic, meaning that the people did not utilize pottery.

The sites discovered by archaeologists suggest they were originally established on low hills and in areas where marine life and terrestrial resources were equally accessible. Faunal remains show about half of animal protein consumed was from terrestrial sources, half from marine sources. The human remains found at these sites also seem to indicate that the residents of the Santa Elena Peninsula were healthy and free of anemia.

During Early Las Vegas the "basic unit of social production, distribution, and consumption was the small, relatively self-sufficient family, flexibly organized for carrying out a wide variety of subsistence tasks using a few generalized tools and facilities." Houses were small and it appears that family units moved from one site to another to take advantage of seasonal food sources. Houses were very small and flimsy. The people gathered wild foods and hunted and fished in the variety of habitats in the region: the desert, dry tropical forest, and the Pacific coast. Deer, fox, rabbit, small rodents, weasel, anteater, squirrel, peccary, opossum, frog, boa constrictor, indigo snake, parrot and lizard were exploited for food.  Intertidal species and crab were also harvested in small quantities.  The Las Vegans were broad-spectrum hunters and were able to hunt these many different species and not rely on any one source of food.  

During the late period, sea levels rose, bringing marine resources closer to established sites. At the same time, big game either became less abundant, or was simply hunted less by the Las Vegans. This loss of big game may have motivated the Las Vegas people to become more sedentary in order to collect more predictable resources. This sedentary lifestyle could have been a strong factor in the beginning of plant cultivation. A more sedentary lifestyle would also help to foster stronger communities. People living in the area would likely have needed to rely on each other more to gather enough resources to survive. The lack of big game meant more time needed to be spent hunting and gathering, as well as tending to crops. Food sharing in this community creates an early form of the reciprocity that shows up throughout the Andean region in various cultures. 
         
Later Las Vegas continued to rely on hunting and gathering, but with a greater dependence on fish and shellfish from the ocean. The harvesting of offshore fish species suggests that the Later Las Vegas people may have had boats. They made a variety of tools from stone and bone points and a spatula have been discovered that may have been used for making nets or textiles. They utilized shell, wood, bamboo, reeds, and bark to make tools and containers. Burial customs underwent a major change in the Later Las Vegas.  Burials took place only at the two major sites (Site 80 and 66/67) of the culture with the remains of people who died elsewhere transported to those sites for burial or reburial. The burial customs suggest that the two main sites had become base camps and ceremonial centers.  Other sites may have been occupied only seasonally as families and bands moved from place to place to hunt, fish, or collect wild plants for food. A closer community could explain the burials found at site 80. As people grew stronger bonds, practices and beliefs could have developed and influenced rituals. There is little evidence of what kinds of rituals were practiced, but we do know that the burials in this area were intentional and happened often. Most of the burials show evidence of first and second burials. In the initial burial, a corpse was placed in a grave in a flexed position. Later on, bones from these burials were unearthed and placed in another burial.

Agriculture

Given the desert and near-desert conditions and the scarcity of surface water, the Santa Elena peninsula does not seem a promising area for pre-historic agriculture, but the Las Vegas people were among the earliest in South America to practice agriculture.  Agriculture did not replace fishing, hunting, and foraging, but complemented these traditional means of subsistence. The earliest domesticated crops may have been calabash or bottle gourd and leren (Calathea allouia, a tropical root crop probably not native to the Santa Elena area). Evidence of their cultivation and domestication date to 7000 BCE. A semi-domesticated type of squash might have been cultivated even earlier. Phytoliths of squash date back to 8000 BCE.  Surprising to archaeologists, maize cultivation was practiced in Las Vegas area by about 4600 BCE. Maize originated in Mexico and its cultivation spread elsewhere.

Even earlier dates were obtained by Zarrillo et al. in 2008. According to their data, early agriculture started in the area c. 11,000 BP (9,000 BC), and maize was already present by 7,500 BP (5,500 BC).

"Maize was introduced to Ecuadorian coastal populations already familiar with plant cultivation. At the preceramic Vegas site (OGSE-80), phytolith assemblages, which included bottle gourd (Lagenaria spp.), the root crop llerén (Calathea spp.), and domesticated-size squash phytoliths, were directly dated to 11,210–9,900 cal B.P., with maize present in directly dated phytolith assemblages to ≈7500 cal B.P."

Also, according to Piperno, the recent dates for maize use by Las Vegas culture are at c. 8053-7818 cal. BP.

Other early maize in the area
Scholars have been debating whether the early planting of maize was done in the lowlands, at the mid-elevations, or perhaps even in the highlands of the Americas. Also, the question remains open whether the first maize in South America was introduced in the lowlands or at the higher elevations.

Recent data has suggested that humans dispersed maize into the upper lowland of northwest Colombia at some time within a date range of 8997-8277 cal. BP. Later, human groups dispersed maize into the mid-elevation forests of the Colombian Andes by 8000-7600 cal. BP.

In 21st century, archaeologists investigated the Cubilan area, in Oña Canton, Ecuador. Recent microbotanical studies from Cubilan recovered maize starches from milling and scrapping lithic tools associated with contexts dated to 8078-7959 cal. BP (about 6,000 BC). This is the oldest evidence of maize in South American highlands.

End of Las Vegas
Archaeologists have found no evidence of the presence of humans on the Santa Elena peninsula for one thousand years after 4600 BCE.  About 3500 BCE, the Valdivia culture appears in the same area as the Las Vegas people lived. The fate of the Las Vegas people is not known.

References

Archaeological cultures of South America
Archaeology of Ecuador
Andean preceramic
Hunter-gatherers of South America
8th millennium BC
History of agriculture
Pre-Columbian cultures
Prehistory of Ecuador
Agriculture in Ecuador
Prehistoric agriculture